A polygraph is a forensic instrument.

Polygraph may also refer to:
 Polygraph (author), an author who can write on a variety of different subjects
 Polygraph (duplicating device), a dual pen device that produces a simultaneous copy of an original while it is written in cursive writing
 Polygraph (film), a 1996 Canadian film
 Polygraph (mathematics), a mathematical generalisation of a directed graph in mathematics, also called a computad
 Autopen, an automatic signing instrument
 A painted reproduction created by the Polygraphic Society in London in the 1700s, by a process also known as "pollaplasiasmos" 
 A 1988 play at the Theatre of Canada by Robert Lepage
 Polygraph.info, a fact-checking service
 An alternative term for Multigraph (orthography)

See also
 Polygraff
 Multigraph (disambiguation)
 Moscow State University of Printing Arts, which was previously called the "Moscow Polygraphic Institute"
 Folly Theatre, in the City of Westminster, an Inner London borough, which from 1855 to 1869 was called "Woodin's Polygraphic Hall". 
 Polygraphic substitution, a method of producing a code
 The Royal Polygraphic Rooms were performance venues in  The Strand in London